Time Is is the final studio album recorded by The Idle Race. It was recorded in 1970 after Jeff Lynne had left the band. He was replaced by vocalist Dave Walker and guitarist Mike Hopkins.

Track listing
"Dancing Flower" (Dave Pritchard) – 2:14
"Sad O'Sad" (Pritchard) – 3:28
"The Clock" (Pritchard) – 3:22
"I Will See You" (Dave Walker) – 3:11
"By the Sun" (Roger Spencer) – 6:42
"Alcatraz" (Pritchard, Spencer, Walker) – 4:02
"And the Rain" (Walker, Pritchard) – 2:52
"She Sang Hymns Out of Tune" (Jesse Lee Kincaid) – 3:07
"Bitter Green" (Gordon Lightfoot) – 3:45
"We Want It All" (Walker, Spencer) – 4:10

Personnel
The Idle Race
Dave Pritchard - vocals, rhythm guitar, flute
Dave Walker - vocals, harmonica, piano
Mike Hopkins - lead guitar, acoustic guitar, vocals
Greg Masters - bass guitar, vocals, electric cello
Roger Spencer - drums, percussion, vocals
Technical
Management - Don Arden
Producer - Idle Race, Kenneth Young
Assistant producer - David Arden
Design, art direction - Joe McGillicuddy
Photography - Tim Fulford-Brown

References

1971 albums
The Idle Race albums